Natmataung National Park is a national park in Myanmar covering . It was established in 2010 and is listed as one of the ASEAN Heritage Parks. In elevation, it ranges from  surrounding Nat Ma Taung in Mindat and Kanpetlet Townships, Chin State. It was designated an Important Bird Area in 2004.

References

External links

National parks of Myanmar
Protected areas established in 1994
Important Bird Areas of Myanmar
ASEAN heritage parks